Robert Sheaffer (born 1949) is an American  freelance writer and UFO skeptic. He is a paranormal investigator of unidentified flying objects, having researched many sightings and written critiques of the hypothesis that UFOs are alien spacecraft. In addition to UFOs, his writings cover topics such as Christianity, academic feminism, the scientific theory of evolution, and creationism. He is the author of six books.

Sheaffer wrote for Skeptical Inquirer (where he contributed the regular "Psychic Vibrations" column), 1977–2017, Fate Magazine, and Spaceflight. He was a founding member (with Philip J. Klass and James Oberg) of the UFO Subcommittee of the Committee for Skeptical Inquiry, and is a former fellow of that organization. He is a graduate of Northwestern University and a member of Mensa.

UFO investigation
Sheaffer has frequently been quoted in the news media regarding UFOs and psychic predictions.

On July 7, 2010 a flight crew preparing to land in Hangzhou's Xiaoshan Airport in China reported a UFO. As a precaution 18 flights were "delayed or redirected". Sheaffer's article in Skeptical Inquirer magazine's November/December 2010 issue is a discussion of how photographs and videos are used. "Reporters want an exciting story, and UFOlogists want to win converts. They will typically grab onto any photo or video that is supposed to represent the object and report as fact practically any claim that is made regardless of its source or veracity."  In the case of the Xiaoshan Airport, most of the footage shown was actually taken a year previous to the July 2010 incident.

Ufologist Kevin D. Randle was interviewed by Sheaffer for Skeptical Inquirer magazine's January/February 2011 issue: looking to "explore their points of agreement and disagreement, finding that Randle gives more weight  to 'eyewitness testimony' than skeptics typically do."

Interviewed by the Toronto Sun newspaper December 20, 2010, Sheaffer is asked by columnist Thane Burnett to debate UFO enthusiast Chris Rutkowski to "debate the known realities". When asked "Is it reasonable to conclude a UFO – something that was beyond our comprehension and understanding – has ever crashed on Earth?"  Sheaffer replies "No, because no one has ever produced any proof of any extraterrestrial technology being retrieved, despite many claims. Talk is cheap, show us the evidence."

On the August 4, 2012 episode of the Skeptic Zone podcast, Sheaffer was interviewed by Richard Saunders. When asked about the UFO phenomenon, Sheaffer said, "The Fortean researcher Hilary Evans has said that the UFO mythos looked at in its fullness is the richest set of contemporary myth when you consider all that has come from it.... The Men in Black, saucer crashes, Roswell, aliens, alien abductions, alien hybrids, it just goes on and on from there. It's not just something narrow like Bigfoot.... UFOs have evolved into this enormous richness as a social phenomenon." He also discussed the fallacy of the trained observer. "Pilots, surprisingly, make relatively poor observers, when they're hit with some surprise, unusual stimulus. Their thought is not, 'Gee let me analyze what that thing is.' Their thought is, 'I'm going to collide with that thing, I'd better go into a bank,' etc."

On January 10, 2014, a series called Close Encounters debuted on the Discovery Canada channel. The episode recounted a UFO incident that happened at Malmstrom Air Force Base in Montana on March 24, 1967. As Sheaffer summarizes it on his blog, "A bright, glowing orange UFO is allegedly seen over the base by security men, and then the Oscar Flight missiles were said to start going off-line, one by one." Sheaffer's investigation concluded that what the base security men probably saw was the planet Mars. "Whenever witnesses report a bright object in the sky that is red or orange, the first thing to check is whether Mars might have been the culprit.... Mars was only about 3 weeks away from its opposition of April 15, 1967, when it would be directly opposite the sun, and at its maximum brightness." As for the base's missiles going off-line, Sheaffer could find no evidence or paper trail to support that, only the claim of (then) Air Force Lieutenant Robert Salas. Noted UFO researcher Robert Hastings responded to Sheaffer's investigation by dismissing the possibility that the glowing object was Mars. Former SAC missile crew commander Tim Hebert goes further than Sheaffer, stating on his blog "At this point in time there is no supporting documentation or statements from security personnel corroborating the claims for what, if anything, was observed out in the field."

Called the "world's top expert on the subject of unidentified flying objects and claims of extraterrestrials" by paranormal investigator Ben Radford in a review of Sheaffer's book Bad UFOs: Critical Thinking About UFO Claims. Radford states that Sheaffer has "encyclopedic knowledge" on "diverse topics" and uses it in the book. The book is ten chapters long and almost 300 pages, he covers '"classic"' as well as "high profiles reports and sightings (that are) decades old". Radford writes that when a UFO claim has been debunked clearly and completely they rarely update their writings or "admit their mistakes... Sheaffer performs a huge... public service... keeping his audience current on old and new claims".

Conspiracy theories
In an interview by Karen Stollznow on Point of Inquiry for May 16, 2011, Sheaffer was asked, "Have any conspiracy theories ever turned out to be correct, or is a 'true conspiracy theory' really something else?" He replied, "Conspiracies occur all the time. Organized crime is a conspiracy... there was a conspiracy to kill President Lincoln.... Real conspiracies do exist but not grand conspiracies [in which] The Masons are planning this, or there's always some shadowy group that you can't really point to or say who's involved."

Climate change

Sheaffer rejects the science of global climate change, writing in 2008 that, "when a prominent theory is opposed by scientists of the caliber of Richard Lindzen of MIT, Reid Bryson of the University of Wisconsin, Freeman Dyson of the Institute for Advanced Study, and many others, it is disingenuous to speak of a 'consensus.'" And concludes, "given that unknown factors have caused previous climate changes, how can we be certain that these same unknown factors are not active today?"

Feminism
Sheaffer has been an outspoken critic of contemporary feminism since the late 1980s. His article, "Feminism, the Noble Lie" was published in the Spring 1995 issue of Free Inquiry Magazine. In it, he criticizes feminist crusades against "satanic cults", and the use of "repressed memories" to uncover supposed "forgotten incest". On his debunker blog, Sheaffer calls modern (post-1960s) feminism a con, and compares it to astrology and parapsychology in its lack of academic peer review, poor scholarship, and prevalence of false and inaccurate information and claims. Sheaffer states that anyone who criticizes the "rampant misinformation" that is prevalent in modern feminism, including feminist scholars such as Christina Hoff Sommers, Camille Paglia, and others, are labeled "enemies of women" and drummed out of the feminist movement. On his website, Sheaffer summarizes his criticism of feminism:

Christianity
Sheaffer has been a vocal critic of creationism, or the belief that God or a Supreme Being created the universe and humanity, and that the Biblical book of Genesis is an accurate account of creation: "Creationists claim they are proving the Genesis account of Creation 'scientifically', but to do so they must violate scientific methodology willy-nilly...so-called 'Scientific Creationism' is just new, modern packaging  for that 'Old-Time Religion.'" In his 1991 book The Making of the Messiah, Sheaffer argues that Christianity developed "from the envious anger of the lower classes" towards "Roman power and wealth." Sheaffer disputes the divinity of Jesus Christ, arguing that his mother Mary was not a virgin, but an adulteress, and that Jesus was an illegitimate child. Sheaffer writes that Christ's claim to operate under a "higher law" came from his resentment at being "despised and rejected" in Jewish society due to the circumstances of his birth. Sheaffer argues that Jesus was not crucified, nor did the resurrection take place, but that the story of the Romans crucifying Jesus was created to win converts among those who resented Roman power and rule across their empire. Booklist, while praising Sheaffer for writing a "stern critique" of the rise of Christianity, also notes that "In his eagerness to prove his point, Sheaffer places more value in the documents contradicting the Gospels than in the Gospels themselves, though clearly both sources contain large amounts of propaganda for their respective sides."

Other writings
In his book, Resentment Against Achievement: Understanding The Assault Upon Ability, Sheaffer describes two systems of morality, the pride of achievement, and the resentment sometimes felt by those who have not achieved success toward those who have. Sheaffer contends that resentment towards achievement is seen in "a hostile suspicion towards "greedy capitalists", who are depicted as exploiters rather than what they really are - the creators of jobs and wealth...We see it in a surly animosity towards managers and owners, who are reviled as enemies...Instead of seeing employers as powerful economic allies, the resentful scorn their values, then blame the "system" for them not being able to find work." He argues that poverty among the lower classes is an inevitable consequence of their flawed values, which emphasize hatred and jealously towards achievement and successful people, and that "people do not steal because they are poor, they are poor because they steal." Sheaffer advocates for a new system of morality based on achievement and success rather than religious morality, which he argues celebrates weakness; he "excoriates religion for romanticizing, and hence perpetuating, economic incompetence...[Sheaffer] urges the impoverished to break away from a slave morality that encourages passivity." A review praises Resentment Against Achievement by stating that "for all its harsh denunciation of the resentful, this book is a positive call to action not to harm people but to help them succeed", and that Sheaffer contends that people "who adopt higher-class values and ethics will gradually find themselves accumulating so much money that no one will doubt their status any longer."

X-Files
The twentieth episode of the third season of the X-Files television series, entitled "Jose Chung's From Outer Space", referenced Robert Sheaffer. The plot featured US Air Force test pilots, dressed as aliens, who flew a secret military aircraft designed to resemble a UFO. One pilot was named "Jacques Sheaffer" and the other "Robert Vallee". According to Sheaffer, Chris Carter, the creator of the X-Files series, decided to name the characters after ufologist Jacques Vallee, and debunker Sheaffer, as a joke. Sheaffer further states that "The M.P. [military policeman] who later arrested them (the test pilots) was Sergeant Hynek", a reference to prominent ufologist J. Allen Hynek.

Speaking engagements
Sheaffer was one of the leaders of a workshop on "Preserving Skeptic History" at The Amazing Meeting in 2013.

He was on the panel of the "UFO Claims" session at CSICon, a conference put on by the Committee for Skeptical Inquiry, in 2011.

He spoke at the "UFOs: The Space-Age Mythology" CSI workshop in 2009.

He spoke at the "Animal Mutilations, Star Maps, UFOs and Television" session of the "Science, Skepticism and the Paranormal" conference put on by  CSICOP in 1983.

He spoke at the "Where Are They" symposium at the University of Maryland, November 1979.

Personal life

Opera
Sheaffer has had a passion for opera since the age of six, and has been taking lessons since 1991. He is a tenor and regularly performs in professional opera productions.

Mensa
Sheaffer is a member of Mensa International, having been introduced to it by Robert Steiner (1934–2013, fellow of the Committee for Skeptical Inquiry, president of the Society of American Magicians from 1988 to 1989).

Bibliography

References

External links
 Sheaffer's website ("The Debunkers Domain")
 Bad UFOs blog

American non-fiction writers
1949 births
American skeptics
Critics of parapsychology
Living people
Male critics of feminism
Mensans
UFO skeptics
Critics of Christianity
Critics of creationism